FFII may refer to:
 Final Fantasy II, a 1988 video game
 Fatal Frame II: Crimson Butterfly, a 2003 video game
 Forensic Files II, a 2020 television series
 Foundation for a Free Information Infrastructure, a non-profit organisation dedicated to establishing a free market in information technology

See also
 FF2 (disambiguation)